Little Marcel is a 1976 French drama film directed by Jacques Fansten.

Cast
 Jacques Spiesser - Marcel
 Isabelle Huppert - Yvette
 Yves Robert - Commissaire Mancini
 Michel Aumont - Taron
 Pierre-Olivier Scotto - Bernard
 Anouk Ferjac - Marie-Paule Mancini
 Jean Dasté - Berger
 Maurice Bénichou - Garcia
 Hubert Gignoux - The mayor
 Jean Lescot - The Dantec
 Jean-François Balmer - Pottier
 Roland Bertin - Toutain
 Jean-Michel Dupuis - Denis
 Jean Benguigui

See also
 Isabelle Huppert on screen and stage

References

External links

1976 films
French drama films
1970s French-language films
1976 drama films
Films directed by Jacques Fansten
1970s French films